The Ain O Salish Kendra (ASK) ( (আসক); Centre for Law and Mediation) is a non-government, a national legal aid and human rights organisation in Bangladesh. It is one of the leading human rights organizations of the country and is highly active in issues of legal and social support to the dis empowered, particularly women, working children and workers as well as exposing human rights abuses by Bangladeshi security forces. It consults with Amnesty International and with the United Nations Economic and Social Council (ECOSOC). The centre was established by prominent Bangladeshi lawyers and activists in 1986. Md Nur Khan acts as the executive director since August 2022.

The organisation provides legal and social support to the dis empowered, particularly women, working children and workers. Its goal is to create a society based on equality, social and gender justice and rule of law. It seeks to create an environment for accountability and transparency of governance institutions.

ASK was registered with the Registrar of Joint Stock Companies, Bangladesh under the Societies Registration Act, XXI in 1986, and with the NGO Affairs Bureau under Foreign Donation Regulation Ordinance, 1978 in 1993. It was accorded special consultative status with ECOSOC in 1998.

ASK's Strategies 
ASK's strategies for promotion and protection of human rights are carried out by 17 units and one component to create awareness, provide legal and social support, monitor institutional transparency, campaign and advocacy for law and policy reform.

Units of ASK     

 Investigation     
 Documentation     
 Publication & Communications     
 Legal Advocacy & Policy Reform     
 Media & International Advocacy     
 Mediation & Rapid Response     
 Litigation     
 Outreach     
 Halfway Home     
 Psycho-social & Counseling     
 Human Rights Awareness     
 Gender and Social Justice     
 Training     
 Child Rights     
 Administration     
 Finance and Accounts     
 Planning, Monitoring & Evaluation

References

Human rights organisations based in Bangladesh
Women's rights organizations
Organizations established in 1986